The Manda are an ethnic and linguistic group based in Ludewa District in the Iringa Region and northern Ruvuma Region of southern Tanzania, along the eastern shore of Lake Malawi.  In 2002 the Manda population was estimated to number 22,000. Some of these lived in Gua land and Mkwajuni, Chunya district in Mbeya region. They also found in areas where fishing activities take place like Mtera Reservoir, nyumba ya mungu, mlimba etc.  Manda people originated from Ngoni

References

Ethnic groups in Tanzania
Indigenous peoples of East Africa